The Recall is an Iranian Drama series. The series is directed by Hojat Ghasemzadeh Asl.

Storyline 
The Recall tells the story of people who, after death, have a chance to live again. Those who are destined, they face death and return to life and now, these survivors are trying to...

Cast 
 Amir Aghaei
 Mehran Ahmadi
 Farhad Ghaemian
 Afshin Sangchap
 Roya Teymourian
 Soraya Ghasemi
 Parviz Poorhosseini
 Masoud Rayegan
 Behnaz Jafari
 Vahid Jalilvand
 Matin Sotoudeh
 Soheila Razavi
 Parivash Nazarieh
 Farokh Nemati
 Roozbeh Hesari
 Maryam Boubani
 Bahram Ebrahimi
 Mehrdad Ziaei
 Ghasem Zare
 Ali Osivand
 Pardis Ahmadieh
 Rahim Norouzi
 Amir Hossein Modares
 Majidi Moshiri
 Ghorban Najafi
 Hossein Fallah
 Mahvash Sabrkon
 Atabak Naderi
 Nader Fallah
 Khosro Farokhzad
 Mehran Zeighami

References

External links
 

2010s Iranian television series
Iranian television series